Christopher Paul Brass (born 24 July 1975) is an English manager and former professional footballer, he who works in a senior recruitment role at Premier League club Nottingham Forest in a role across The Academy and First Team.

As a player, he was a defender in the Football League for Burnley, Torquay United, Halifax Town, York City and Bury. He also played non-league football for Harrogate Town, Southport and Hyde United. Between 2003 and 2004 at the age of 27 he was player/manager of York, he wouldn't return to management until 12 years later when he returned to Bury as manager. He has also worked on the coaching staff at Scunthorpe United, Torquay United and Wigan Athletic.

Career

Early career
Born in Easington, County Durham, Brass began his career as a schoolboy at Ipswich Town before progressing through the youth system at Burnley as a trainee, where he turned professional on 8 July 1993.

Burnley
In 1994, Brass captained the Burnley A team as it won the Lancashire League. In need of first team experience, he joined Torquay United on loan in October 1994, playing seven league games in a two-month loan spell.

Brass returned to Burnley, making his debut for them as a substitute in a 1–0 defeat away to Portsmouth, in January 1995. The following season, he again struggled to claim a regular place, but in the 1996–97 season established himself in the centre of the Burnley defence, and remained there for the next three seasons, though occasionally played out of position by manager Chris Waddle.

By March 1998, such was the turmoil that the Clarets found themselves in, Brass was their longest serving player, and still only 22 years old. In that summer, Stan Ternent replaced Waddle, and made Brass captain, but the latter struggled to keep his form and found himself in the reserves. In the summer of 1999, Burnley signed Mitchell Thomas, resulting in Brass playing only occasionally for the first team. He went on a one-month loan to Halifax Town in September 2000, with the first of his six league games being a win against Torquay. After the loan was up, Halifax could not afford to sign him and he returned to the Burnley reserves, before joining York City on a free transfer in March 2001. He had played 134 league games for Burnley, scoring once, ironically against York City.

York City
Brass was immediately installed as captain at York and on 4 June 2003, aged only 27, was appointed as York's player-manager. Although his first season in charge began well, York failed to win any of their final 20 league games and were relegated to the Football Conference. Results were not much better in the Conference and Brass was sacked as manager in November 2004. He remained at York as a player and, after suffering a serious ligament injury, joined Harrogate Town on loan in September 2005 in an attempt to regain match-fitness. He finished the loan with 11 appearances. He joined Southport on a one-month loan in November 2005, which was extended for another month in January 2006. He returned to York in January after making five appearances and on 12 January was released by the club after a settlement was reached over the remainder of his contract.

Bury
He joined League Two club Bury on a contract until the end of the 2005–06 season on 17 January. He scored a notable own goal, when attempting an overhead clearance in the game against Darlington, kicking the ball into his nose and subsequently the net. Brass nearly received a broken nose to add to the humiliation. This incident was voted the number one incident in magazine FourFourTwo's "It shouldn't happen to a footballer". He signed a new one-year contract with Bury in June 2006, being released at the end of the 2006–07 season, but was asked to return to pre-season training to prove his fitness before a decision could be made on his future.

Coaching career
Brass was appointed as Bury's Centre of Excellence manager on 6 July 2007, before combining this role with playing for Hyde United after signing in July 2007 following a successful trial. He became Bury's caretaker manager on 15 January 2008, following the sacking of Chris Casper, and remained in post until the appointment of Alan Knill on 4 February 2008. Brass left Hyde having made 62 appearances after being appointed assistant manager to Knill on 22 January 2009. When Knill was appointed Scunthorpe United manager on 31 March 2011, Brass followed him as assistant manager. After Knill was dismissed by Scunthorpe United he followed Knill to Torquay United where Knill was appointed as manager on an interim basis until the end of the season. Knill and Brass ensured Torquay United's Football League safety. He was appointed on a permanent basis, along with Knill, following the end of the season. On 18 December 2013, Bury appointed Brass as assistant manager, to work alongside manager David Flitcroft. In June 2015 Brass was appointed Head of Football Operations. On 16 November 2016, Brass and Ryan Kidd took over as caretaker managers, following the sacking of David Flitcroft.

On 15 December 2016, Brass was named the head coach of Bury until the end of 2016–17 season, but on 15 February 2017, Brass was replaced by Lee Clark.

In October 2018, he moved to Wigan Athletic to take up the role of Head of Football Operations

Managerial statistics

References

External links

1975 births
Living people
Sportspeople from Easington, County Durham
Footballers from County Durham
English footballers
Association football defenders
Ipswich Town F.C. players
Burnley F.C. players
Torquay United F.C. players
Halifax Town A.F.C. players
York City F.C. players
Harrogate Town A.F.C. players
Southport F.C. players
Bury F.C. players
Hyde United F.C. players
English Football League players
National League (English football) players
English football managers
York City F.C. managers
Bury F.C. managers
English Football League managers
National League (English football) managers
Torquay United F.C. non-playing staff
Bury F.C. non-playing staff
Scunthorpe United F.C. non-playing staff
Wigan Athletic F.C. non-playing staff
Nottingham Forest F.C. non-playing staff